The SKANS School of Accountancy is an accountancy academy situated in different cities of Pakistan. It was established in early 1992 in [Garden Town [Lahore]] and then spread all over the Pakistan.

Courses
Courses which can be studied in the academy are:
 Association of Chartered Certified Accountants (ACCA)
 Certified Accounting Technician (CAT)
 Chartered Accountant (CA)
 Chartered Institute of Management Accountants (CIMA)
 Foundations in Accountancy (FIA)
 Certified Information Systems Auditor (CISA)
 Chartered Financial Analyst (CFA)
 Certified Information Security Manager (CISM)
 Bachelor of Applied Accounting

Affiliations
It is affiliated with the following institutions:
 Institute of Chartered Accountants of Pakistan (ICAP)
 Association of Chartered Certified Accountants, UK (ACCA-UK)

Campuses
Following are the cities in which campuses of SKANS School of Accountancy are located:
 Lahore
 Islamabad
 Faisalabad
 Multan
 Rawalpindi
 Peshawar
 Gujranwala
 Sialkot

See also
 Professionals' Academy of Commerce (PAC)

References

External links 
 SKANS official website

Accounting schools in Pakistan